, or Dai-ichi Life for short, is the third-largest life insurer in Japan by revenue, behind Japan Post Insurance and Nippon Life.

Founded on September 15, 1902, Dai-Ichi was one of the oldest mutual insurance companies in Japan until a motion to demutualise was passed in 2009 and, on April 1, 2010, it listed on the Tokyo Stock Exchange, raising 1.01 trillion yen. As of March 2013, it had the most assets of any listed company in Japan with a total of 33 trillion yen on its stand-alone balance sheet, more than twice the total assets of #2-ranked Tokyo Electric Power Company.

It was announced in October 2014 that Dai-ichi would raise US$1 billion by issuing US-dollar-denominated subordinated bonds in overseas markets.

It is also the largest single shareholder of the Tokyu Corporation, holding 6.35% of all issued stock.

Key facts 
As of March 30, 2006
 Total assets - US$276,552 million
 Policy reserves - US$227,524 million
 Total capital - US$21,425 million
 Solvency margin ratio - 1,095.5%
 Policies in force - US$2,085 billion
 Policyholders - 8,646,469

History 

 1902 - Founded
 1938 - head office is moved to its current Yurakucho, Tokyo location.
 1975 - first overseas representative office is established in New York City.
 1982 - first European representative office is established in London.
 1990 - investment in Lincoln National Life Insurance Company marked the first time a Japanese company  participated in capitalizing a leading U.S. insurer.
 1993 - completion of the DN Tower 21, a new head office building.
 1995 - Great Hanshin earthquake: simplification of claims settlement procedures.
 1996 - establishment of the Dai-ichi Property and Casualty Insurance Co., Ltd.
 1997 - establishment of Dai-ichi Life Research Institute Inc.
 1999 - agreement on total business cooperation with the Industrial Bank of Japan (now Mizuho Financial Group.)
 2000 - agreement to form a comprehensive business alliance with Sompo Japan Insurance and Aflac.
 2002 - celebration of its 100th Anniversary.
 2010 - Demutualization and stock listing on the Tokyo Stock Exchange
 2011 - completes take over of ASX listed Tower Australia life insurance company, the wholly owned subsidiary is then renamed TAL
 2015 - purchased Protective Life Corporation

References

External links 
The Dai-ichi Mutual Life Insurance Company (in Japanese)
The Dai-ichi Mutual Life Insurance Company Annual Report (in English)

 
Insurance companies based in Tokyo
Companies listed on the Tokyo Stock Exchange
Financial services companies established in 1902
Japanese brands